The Dogon dialects of the western plains below the Bandiagara Escarpment is Mali are mutually intelligible. They are sometimes called the Kan Dogon because they use the word kan (also spelled kã) for varieties of speech. The dialects are:

Tomo kã
Teŋu kã
Togo kã

The latter two are traditionally subsumed under the name Tene kã (Tene Kan, Tene Tingi), but Hochstetler separates them because the three varieties are about equidistant.

There are a quarter million speakers of these dialects, about evenly split between Tomo Kan and Tene Kan, making this the most populous of the Dogon languages. There are a few Tomo-speaking villages just across the border in Burkina Faso.

Phonology

Consonants 

 Consonant germination also occurs frequently among sounds .
  can only occur among loanwords.

 Consonant sound  only rarely occurs and in almost absent.
 Consonant sounds  are absent, except in loanwords.
  can be realized as a fricative  between vowel sounds .
 Sounds  only occur from loanwords, and are interchangeable.
 Glottal sound  can only occur as an element in some reduplicated forms of vowel-initial words, or between vowels within a word.

Vowels 

References

 .
 

Dogon languages
Languages of Mali
Languages of Burkina Faso